Coosa shiner (Notropis xaenocephalus) is a species of ray-finned fish in the genus Notropis. It is endemic to the United States where it inhabits the Coosa and Tallapoosa river systems in the Mobile Bay drainage above the Fall Line in southeastern Tennessee, northwestern Georgia, and eastern Alabama.

References 

 Robert Jay Goldstein, Rodney W. Harper, Richard Edwards: American Aquarium Fishes. Texas A&M University Press 2000, p. 106  
 

Notropis
Fish described in 1877
Taxa named by David Starr Jordan